Óscar Adrián Rojas Castillón (born 2 August 1981) is a Mexican former professional footballer who played as a right-back.

Rojas was trained in América's youth system and made his debut in the Invierno 2001 season against Celaya. Rojas was part of the 2002 América team that won the championship, although Rojas only played two games.  After 2 seasons of little activity with América, he was transferred to San Luis where he became an instant starter. Rojas played 4 seasons with San Luis until San Luis was relegated. Rojas played 68 out of the 76 games that San Luis played in the Primera División (First Division). Rojas returned to América for the Apertura 2004 season. He won his second championship with América during the Clausura 2005.

Honours

América
 CONCACAF Giants Cup: 2001
 Mexican Championship: Clausura 2005
 Campeón De Campeones (Mexican Super Cup): 2005
 CONCACAF Champions' Cup: 2006

Puebla
 Copa MX: Clausura 2015

Mexico
 Central American and Caribbean Games: Silver Medal 2002

International goals

|-
| 1. || June 10, 2009 || Estadio Azteca, Mexico City, Mexico ||  || 2–1 || 2–1 || 2010 FIFA World Cup qualification
|}

External links
 
 
 Oscar Rojas at FootballDatabase.com

1981 births
Living people
Mexico international footballers
Footballers from Mexico City
Liga MX players
Club América footballers
San Luis F.C. players
C.F. Pachuca players
Club Puebla players
Association football fullbacks
Mexican footballers
Central American and Caribbean Games silver medalists for Mexico
Competitors at the 2002 Central American and Caribbean Games
Central American and Caribbean Games medalists in football